Sorkh Cheshmeh (also Romanized as Sorkh Cheshmeh; also known as Sorkheh Cheshmeh) is a village in Rezqabad Rural District, in the Central District of Esfarayen County, North Khorasan Province, Iran. At the 2006 census, its population was 47, in 15 families.

References 

Populated places in Esfarayen County